Pedro de Alcántara Alonso Pérez de Guzmán y Lopez-Pacheco, 14th Duke of Medina Sidonia (25 August 1724–6 January 1779) became Duke of Medina Sidonia in 1739.

He was married on 22 October 1743, aged around 19, to Mariana de Silva y Álvarez de Toledo, whose mother was known as María Teresa Álvarez de Toledo y Haro, was 11th Duchess of Alba de Tormes in her own right.  He became a Knight of the Order of the Golden Fleece in 1753, aged 29. He was also Caballerizo mayor to King Charles III. No issue, and title passed to his cousin.

He was elected a Fellow of the Royal Society in November 1749.

References

1724 births
1779 deaths
Fellows of the Royal Society
Dukes of Medina Sidonia
Knights of the Golden Fleece of Spain